The 1954–55 Tercera División season was the 19th since its establishment.

Format 
164 teams competed in 16 geographic groups.  For the first time there were North African and Balearic Islands groups. 

Promotion:Each group winner and runner-up (32 teams) progressed to the Fase Final where 4 groups of 8 teams were formed. The four group winners were promoted to the Segunda División.

Relegation The remaining teams in the geographic groups were joined by teams from the fourth tier - the Regional leagues - to contest places in the following season's Tercera División.

League tables

Group I

Group II

Group III

Group IV

Group V

Group VI

Group VII

Group VIII

Mallorca

Note: RCD Mallorca qualified for the Fase Final. Runners-up Constancia played-off against the Menorca sub-group winners for the second spot in the Fase Final.

Menorca

Note: Maó qualified for a play-off against the Mallorca sub-group runners-up.

Group VIII Final

Group IX

Group X

Group XI

Group XII

Group XIII

Group XIV

Group XV

Group XVI

Promotion play-offs

Group I

Group II

Group III

Group IV

Relegation play-offs

Group I

Group II

Group III

Group IV

Group V

Group VI

Group VII

Group VIII

Group IX

Group X

Group XI

Group XII

Group XIII

Occidental

Oriental

Group XIV

Group XV

Group XVI

Season records
 Most wins: 15, Girona.
 Most draws: 7, Granollers, Atlético Palentino and Guadalajara.
 Most losses: 16, Unión Castilla.
 Most goals for: 64, Don Benito.
 Most goals against: 82, Unión Castilla.
 Most points: 31, Girona.
 Fewest wins: 1, Santanyí and Unión Castilla.
 Fewest draws: 0, 8 teams.
 Fewest losses: 1, Maó and Ceuta.
 Fewest goals for: 9, Alaior.
 Fewest goals against: 8, Maó.
 Fewest points: 3, Unión Castilla.

Notes

External links
RSSSF 
Futbolme 

Tercera División seasons
3
Spain